Malbaza FC is a Nigerien soccer team based in Malbaza, Niger, approximately 6 hours east of the capital Niamey.  Financed by the local concrete plant, the team plays in the Niger Premier League. Players are drawn from the Tahoua region.  They play in Stade de Malbaza.

In 2010 they earned their spot in the Niger Premier League by winning the D2 Division.  They were relegated from the Premier League after the 2011 season.

Achievements
Niger Premier League: 1
 1984

Niger Cup: 2
 1984, 1985

Football clubs in Niger